City on a Hill is an American crime drama series created by Charlie MacLean, based on a story by Ben Affleck and MacLean. The series stars Kevin Bacon, Aldis Hodge, Amanda Clayton, Cathy Moriarty, Kevin Dunn, and Jill Hennessy. The series premiered on June 7, 2019 (online) and June 16, 2019 (Showtime). On August 2, 2019, Showtime renewed the series for a second season, which premiered on March 28, 2021. On June 2, 2021, the series was renewed for a third season which premiered on July 31, 2022. On October 27, 2022, Showtime cancelled the series after  three seasons.

Cast

Main
 Kevin Bacon as Retired FBI Agent John "Jackie" Rohr
 Aldis Hodge as Assistant District Attorney DeCourcy Ward
 Jonathan Tucker as Francis "Frankie" Ryan
 Mark O'Brien as James "Jimmy" Ryan (Season 1-2)
 Lauren E. Banks as Siobhan Quay
 Amanda Clayton as Catherine "Cathy" Ryan
 Jere Shea as Boston P.D. Detective Henry "Hank" Signa
 Kevin Chapman as Boston P.D. Detective J.R. "Dickie" Minogue
 Jill Hennessy as Jennifer "Jenny" Rohr
 Matthew Del Negro as Boston P.D. Detective Chris Caysen

Recurring
 Cathy Moriarty as Dottie Ryan, Frankie and Jimmy's Mother
 Rory Culkin as Clay Roach
 Kevin Dunn as District Attorney Nathan Rey
 Vincent Elbaz as Boston Police Officer Hugo Rhys
 Zoe Margaret Colletti (Season 1) and Lucia Ryan (Season 2) as Benedetta "Benny" Rohr, Jackie and Jenny's Daughter
 Mark Ryder as Father Diarmuid Doyle
 Sarah Shahi as Rachel Benham
 Jimmy Cummings as Tommy Hayes
 Georgina Reilly as Corie Struthers
 James Remar as Richard "Richy" Ryan, Frankie and Jimmy's Father
 Gloria Reuben as Eloise Hastings, Siobhan's Mother
 Kathryn Erbe as Sue Stanton
  Charles Brice as Louie Ward, DeCourcy's Brother and Louie's Father
 Ernie Hudson as Franklin Ward, DeCourcy's father
 Corbin Bernsen as Sinclair Dryden, Jackie's mentor
 Joanne Kelly as Letitia Dryden, Sinclair's wife
 Michael O'Keefe as Salvy Clasby
 Seth Gilliam as Reverend Jasper Fields
 Lee Tergesen as Vito "The Pig" Lupo
 Amr Elsheikh as Moustafa Mody

Episodes

Season 1 (2019)

Season 2 (2021)

Season 3 (2022)

Development
The show was picked up by Showtime in May 2018.

Release
The series premiered on June 16, 2019.

Reception

Critical response
The review aggregator website Rotten Tomatoes reported a 76% approval rating with an average score of 6.9/10, based on 37 reviews. The website's critical consensus reads, "Though City on a Hills meandering story can't quite match its ambitions, it's entertaining—and even occasionally riveting—to watch Kevin Bacon and company take on bureaucracy." Metacritic, which uses a weighted average, assigned a score of 65 out of 100 based on 22 critics, indicating "generally favorable reviews".

Ratings

Season 1

Season 2

Season 3

References

External links

2010s American crime drama television series
2020s American crime drama television series
2019 American television series debuts
2022 American television series endings
English-language television shows
Showtime (TV network) original programming
Television series set in the 1990s
Television shows set in Boston
Police corruption in fiction
Television series about prosecutors